Michele Theresa Imperial Gumabao (born September 2, 1992) is a Filipino volleyball player and beauty pageant titleholder. She is currently signed to the Creamline Cool Smashers of the Premier Volleyball League (PVL), and has previously played for teams in the Philippine Super Liga (PSL). She was named "Best Opposite Spiker" five times in her professional career and was the Finals  in the 2016 Shakey's V-League Reinforced Conference.

She played collegiate volleyball for the De La Salle Lady Spikers, winning the UAAP title three consecutive times. She was named "Best Blocker" twice and as co-captain of the team, she was named Finals MVP in her last season.

She has appeared on television as a sports analyst, and was a celebrity housemate in Pinoy Big Brother: All In (2014), where she lasted for 57 days. She also ventured into beauty pageants. She was crowned Binibining Pilipinas Globe in 2018, and represented the Philippines at Miss Globe later that year, placing in the top 15. In 2020, she was the second runner-up in the first edition of Miss Universe Philippines.

Actor-politician Dennis Roldan (Mitchell Gumabao) is her father, while actor Marco Gumabao is her brother.

Personal life
Michele Theresa Imperial Gumabao was born in San Mateo, California, on September 2, 1992. She studied in School of the Holy Spirit of Quezon City before going to De La Salle University, where she was a consistent Dean's Lister. In October 2013, Gumabao graduated with a Bachelor of Science degree with a major in marketing management.

She is the daughter of former PBA player and actor Dennis Roldan and the sister of actor Marco Gumabao and cousin of TV anchor Gretchen Fullido.

Volleyball career
Gumabao was a member of the women's volleyball team of De La Salle University for four years (2010-2013), during which the team won three consecutive championship titles in the UAAP. She was two-time Best Blocker in seasons 73 and 74 and the Finals Most Valuable Player in season 75. Gumabao did not play in her final year of eligibility in the UAAP after her graduation.

In 2013, she played in the Philippine Super Liga for the PCSO Bingo Milyonaryo Puffins. In 2014, she joined the AirAsia Flying Spikers for the 2014 All-Filipino Conference. Gumabao did not play at the start of the tournament because she joined the Pinoy Big Brother show. After her eviction from Pinoy Big Brother: All-In on June 22, 2014, Gumabao resumed playing for AirAsia, helping the team to a fourth-place finish in the tournament. In the 2014 Philippine Super Liga Grand Prix Conference, she played for the Generika Lifesavers, which took over the AirAsia team. For the 2015 Philippine Super Liga season, she joined the Philips Gold Lady Slammers (later known as the Pocari Sweat Lady Warriors), where she was named team captain.

On January 11, 2017, Gumabao announced her departure from the Pocari Sweat franchise following her decision not to renew her contract due to a falling out with the team management. A week later, she joined the new volleyball team United VC for their participation in the 2017 season of the PSL.

Gumabao joined Creamline Cool Smashers in March 2018 for the Premier Volleyball League along with Alyssa Valdez, Jia Morado and her former college teammate, Mel Gohing. In July 2018, the team won its first PVL championship in the Reinforced Conference and in December, the team won the Premier Volleyball League Open Conference.

In January 2022, she announced that she is taking an indefinite leave from playing to focus on the 2022 elections.

Coaching
In January 2016, Gumabao joined the Adamson University Lady Falcons as an assistant coach for UAAP Season 78.

In June 2017, she became the camp director of the Alaska Volleyball Powercamp in Baguio City.

Clubs
  PCSO Bingo Milyonaryo Puffins (2013)
  AirAsia Flying Spikers (2014)
  Generika Lifesavers (2014)
  Philips Gold Lady Slammers (2015–2016)
  Pocari Sweat Lady Warriors (2016)
  COCOLIFE Asset Managers (2017)
  Creamline Cool Smashers (2018–present; on leave since 2022)

Awards

Individuals
 UAAP Season 73 "Best Blocker"
 UAAP Season 74 "Best Blocker"
 UAAP Season 75 "Finals Most Valuable Player"
 2015 Philippine Super Liga All-Filipino "Best Opposite Spiker"
 2015 Philippine Super Liga Grand Prix "1st Best Opposite Spiker"
 Shakey's V-League 13th Season Open Conference "Best Opposite Spiker"
 Shakey's V-League 13th Season Reinforced Conference "Best Opposite Spiker"
 Shakey's V-League 13th Season Reinforced Conference "Finals Most Valuable Player"
 2018 Premier Volleyball League Reinforced Conference "Best Opposite Spiker"

Television
Gumabao plans on pursuing a career in marketing or television hosting.

In 2013, she served as a Shakey's V-League analyst. On March 17, 2013, she appeared on ABS-CBN's talk show, Gandang Gabi Vice with her teammate, Mika Reyes and two members of their rival school's team, the Lady Eagles, Fille Cainglet and Gretchen Ho. On March 20, 2013, she also appeared in the segment "Ihaw Na!" on ABS-CBN's gag show, Banana Nite. She participated in ABS-CBN's Kapamilya All-Star Volleyball Game, which was held on October 6, 2013. The event is part of the network's 60th anniversary celebration. In 2014, she became a Star Magic talent.

In January 2016, Gumabao joined ABS-CBN Sports+Action as a game analyst for NCAA Season 91 volleyball.

Pinoy Big Brother: All In

On April 27, 2014, Gumabao entered the Pinoy Big Brother house as one of the celebrity housemates along with Jane Oineza, Alex Gonzaga and Daniel Matsunaga in its 11th season which features adults, teens and celebrities. She was evicted on Day 57  on June 22, 2014.

Pageantry

Binibining Pilipinas 2018
On January 16, 2018, it was confirmed that Gumabao will be competing at the Binibining Pilipinas 2018 pageant.

On March 18, she was crowned as Binibining Pilipinas Globe 2018.

Miss Globe 2018
She represented the Philippines in the Miss Globe 2018 beauty pageant. Gumabao won the Miss Social Media and Dream Girl awards while finishing at the top 15.

Miss Universe Philippines 2020
Gumabao represented Quezon City at the Miss Universe Philippines 2020 pageant, the first edition of Miss Universe Philippines. During the preliminaries, she was the recipient of a special sponsor award, Miss MG Philippines. In the finale, she finished second runner-up behind titleholder Rabiya Mateo of Iloilo City and first runner-up Ysabella Ysmael of Parañaque.

Endorsements
She has endorsed the sanitary napkin brand, Modess and she also endorses Toby's Sports, one the Philippines’ top sports retail establishments, along with basketball player James Yap and Azkals goalkeeper, Neil Etheridge.

In January 2016, Gumabao became a brand ambassador of Akari lighting products.

Politics
Gumabao is a convenor of the women's group Magdalena Mission: Alagang Ate ("Care of an Older Sister"). Magdalena, partnered with the National Task Force to End Local Communist Armed Conflict (NTF-ELCAC), aims to empower young women and guide them away from communist recruitment. Gumabao is the group's advocate for women's psychosocial empowerment and mental health. As of 2020 and 2021, she is an ambassadress for the Philippine National Police's Kabataan Kontra Droga at Terorismo program.

On October 8, 2021, she filed her candidacy for the 2022 elections as the second nominee of Mothers for Change (MOCHA) party-list.

Filmography

Television

References

External links
 Volleyverse profile
 Michele Gumabao wins two Miss Globe 2018 special awards 

1992 births
Living people
Binibining Pilipinas winners
Star Magic
Filipina gravure idols
Filipino YouTubers
De La Salle University alumni
Miss Universe Philippines winners
Pinoy Big Brother contestants
People from San Mateo, California
Opposite hitters
University Athletic Association of the Philippines volleyball players
Philippines women's international volleyball players
Filipino women's volleyball players
Sportspeople from California